Tragocephala pulchra is a species of beetle in the family Cerambycidae. It was described by Frederick George Waterhouse in 1880, originally under the genus Rhaphidopsis. It contains the varietas Tragocephala pulchra var. pauliani.

References

pulchra
Beetles described in 1880